Kaugutu may refer to:

 Karugutu, Kenya, a settlement in Nyandarua County, Kenya
 Karugutu, Uganda, a settlement in Ntoroko District, Western Region of Uganda.